Senator Berman may refer to:

Arthur Berman (1935–2020), Illinois State Senate
Carol Berman (born 1923), New York State Senate